Mesagrion leucorrhinum is a species of damselfly. Its monotypic genus Mesagrion was formerly in the subfamily Argiolestinae of the flatwing damselfly family (Megapodagrionidae). As a result of molecular phylogenetic studies by Bybee et al. in 2021, it is now in its own family, Mesagrionidae.

Mesagrion leucorrhinum is endemic to Colombia. Its natural habitats are subtropical or tropical moist montane forests and rivers. It is threatened by habitat loss.

Sources

Endemic fauna of Colombia
Arthropods of Colombia
Odonata of South America
Insects described in 1885
Taxa named by Edmond de Sélys Longchamps
Taxonomy articles created by Polbot